The 1909 Brown Bears football team represented Brown University as an independent during the 1909 college football season. Led by third-year head coach J. A. Gammons, Brown compiled a record of 7–3.

Schedule

References

Brown
Brown Bears football seasons
Brown Bears football